Sammy Butcher is an Pitjantjatjara–Warlpiri musician who formed the Warumpi Band.

Biography
Butcher was born at Papunya, Northern Territory in Central Australia.

His mother's side is from the south, the Pitjantjatjara tribe and his father's side from the Walpiri from Pikilyi, near Yinjirrimardi area.

He formed the Warumpi Band with George Burarrwanga, Neil Murray and Gordon Butcher in the late 1970s.

Butcher released a solo album Desert Surf Guitar on CAAMA music. The album's name was inspired by the sand hills surrounding Papunya, "you can imagine them as being huge red waves on the ocean" He was the subject of the documentary Sammy Butcher, Out of the Shadows, part of the Nganampa Anwernekenhe series. The documentary looks at his life after the Warumpi Band.

He is renowned as one of the best guitar players to come out of Central Australia.

References

Indigenous Australian musicians
Musicians from the Northern Territory
Australian guitarists
Living people
Year of birth missing (living people)